John Rudd (born 26 May 1981 in London) is a former rugby union footballer who played on the wing or at centre. John Rudd spent a decade as a professional rugby player representing London Wasps, Northampton, Newcastle Falcons and London Irish amassing more than 200 professional matches in his career.

John Rudd represented England at various levels including U21, Sevens and England Saxons.

References

External links 
Newcastle profile
England profile
Wasps profile
Rudd signs for Newcastle Falcons
Northampton net winger Rudd

1981 births
Living people
English rugby union players
London Irish players
Wasps RFC players
Newcastle Falcons players
Northampton Saints players
Rosslyn Park F.C. players
Rugby union players from London
Rugby union wings